The 182nd Infantry Regiment is a regiment of the United States Army, forming part of the Massachusetts National Guard. It is among the oldest regiments in the U.S. Army, tracing its organizational roots back to 1636, and is one of several National Guard units with colonial roots and a campaign credit for the War of 1812. 

The regiment traces its history back more than 230 years, when it was part of the colonial militia in Massachusetts. It later served in the Continental Army during the American Revolutionary War, with Union forces in the American Civil War, and as a federalized Massachusetts National Guard regiment with the U.S. Army during World War I and World War II. 

For many years, the regiment was a mechanized unit, and in 2006 the regiment was converted into the 182nd Cavalry Regiment, headquartered at Melrose Armory in Melrose, Massachusetts. Converted back into an infantry regiment in 2010, the only active element of the regiment is its 1st Battalion.

History

Formation and colonial operations

The 182nd Infantry Regiment traces its origins to the North Regiment which was constituted and organized on 7 October 1636 from existing training bands at Charlestown, New Town, Watertown, Concord, and Dedham.  The regiment was redesignated on 10 March 1643 as the Regiment of Middlesex.  As a colonial regiment operating in the American wilderness, the regiment was quick to incorporate changes in tactical doctrine based on conditions encountered in fighting Native Americans in King Philip's War and other conflicts, requiring each militiaman to own a modern flintlock musket prior to 1675.  The unit was divided into two regiments on 13 October 1680, one designated as the Lower Regiment of Middlesex, to include the town of Charlestown, Cambridge, Watertown, Woburn, Malden and Reading. It was redesignated prior to 1733 as the 1st Regiment of Militia of Middlesex.  (The 2nd Middlesex Regiment, born of this division, has also survived as the 181st Infantry Regiment).

Massachusetts Army and the American Revolution
At the onset of the American Revolutionary War, the Massachusetts Provincial Congress, meeting as a shadow government, ordered the activation of the 1st Middlesex County Regiment on 19 April 1775.  It was reorganized and entered the Massachusetts Army as Gardner's Regiment on 23 April 1775 (elements of the regiment remained with the 1st Middlesex County Regiment for depot guards and for local defense). It was redesignated as Bond's Regiment upon the death of Colonel Gardner, on 3 July 1775. The unit was again redesignated on 1 January 1776 as the 25th Continental Regiment of the Continental Army, and on 1 January 1777 as the 7th Massachusetts Regiment, Continental Line.  The regiment was mustered out of Continental service on 12 June 1783.

War of 1812
The 182nd Infantry is one of only nineteen Army National Guard units with campaign credit for the War of 1812.

Civil War
The unit was ordered into active service for the defense of Washington on 19 April 1861 with attached companies from the 1st and 7th Regiments of Infantry, Massachusetts Volunteer Militia, and Major Cook's Light Artillery Company. It was mustered into federal service on 1 May 1861 at Washington, D.C., for three months service, and assigned to the 1st Brigade, 3rd Division. It participated in the First Battle of Bull Run before being mustered out on 1 August 1861 at Boston. The unit was again mustered into federal service between 16 September – 8 October 1862 at Wenham for nine months service; during which time it served in the Department of North Carolina and with the XVIII Corps. It was mustered out on 2 July 1863 at Wenham. It was mustered into federal service at Camp Meigs, Readville, Massachusetts, in July 1864 for 100 days service and served with the VIII Corps in the Middle Military Division (Baltimore and vicinity) before being mustered out on 16 November 1864 at Readville and resumed state militia status as the Massachusetts Volunteer Militia.

National Guard and overseas service
During the 1898 Spanish–American War the 5th Massachusetts was mustered into federal service but did not go overseas. On 15 November 1907, the 5th Massachusetts, as part of the land forces of the Massachusetts Volunteer Militia, was redesignated as a regiment of the Massachusetts National Guard.

The 5th Massachusetts was mustered into federal service on 25 June 1916 at Framingham for duty on the Mexican Border while stationed at El Paso, Texas. The regiment mustered out between 10–15 November 1916. It was called into federal service on 25 July 1917 and drafted into federal service on 5 August 1917 for service in World War I. The 5th Massachusetts was redesignated on 11 February 1918 as the 3rd Pioneer Infantry Regiment, and served in the U.S. First Army sector in France before being demobilized between 25–31 July 1919 at Camp Devens.

The unit was reorganized on 5 July 1920 as the 5th Infantry Regiment of the Massachusetts National Guard. On 21 March 1923, it was redesignated as the 182nd Infantry Regiment, and assigned to the 51st Infantry Brigade along with the 101st Infantry Regiment. The 51st Infantry Brigade was assigned to the 26th Infantry Division. The regimental headquarters was subsequently organized and federally recognized on 11 April 1923 with headquarters at Charlestown.

World War II

The unit was inducted into federal service on 16 January 1941 at Charlestown for service in World War II. It was relieved from the 26th Division and assigned to Task Force 6814, on 14 January 1942, which was sent to Melbourne, Australia.

On 6 March 1942 the men of the 182nd broke camp outside Melbourne and boarded troop trains for the docks in Melbourne.  With the rest of the Task Force, the 182nd traveled to a classified destination which turned out to be New Caledonia, where they arrived on 12 March 1942.  On 27 May 1942, Task Force 6814 was redesignated the Americal Division, one of only two American infantry divisions to be assigned a name instead of a number (Americal is a combination of the words American and Caledonia).

As part of a piecemeal transfer of the Americal Division, the 182nd was deployed to combat in the Battle of Guadalcanal on 12 November 1942, where the regiment's 3rd Battalion participated in an operation to capture the Japanese defensive works atop the Sea Horse, a prominent terrain feature on the island.  Maintaining contact with elements of other U.S. Army regiments in the assault, the 3rd Battalion began its ascent, and by 30 December was in action against Japanese forces atop the Sea Horse.  The fighting was so intense that some of the Americans could not be removed after being killed, and were buried where they fell.  In 2008, the remains of Lt. Raymond S. Woods of the 182nd Infantry Regiment, who was killed in action on 30 December 1942 in fighting atop the Sea Horse Ridge, were located and transferred to JPAC. The 182nd later fought in the Bougainville campaign, the Northern Solomons, and later in the Battle of Leyte.

On 26 March 1945, during Operation Victor II, the 182nd landed at Talisay Beach, four miles (6.5 km) west of Cebu City, taking Cebu City the next day.  Moving into the jungled hills of the interior, the 182nd fought the Battle of Go Chan Hill 28–29 March 1945 and then battled to clear the other hills in the area.  They were heavily counterattacked by fanatical Japanese defenders on Bolo Ridge.  After eliminating Japanese resistance on Cebu, the 182nd rested and reequipped, later boarding ship from Cebu for occupation duty in Japan.

Near the end of the war, the Americal Division was renamed the 23rd Infantry Division, though it retained its original designation in both official documents and informal usage throughout the war.

Later service
The 2nd Battalion inactivated on 29 November 1945 at Fort Lewis, Washington. The regiment (less 2nd Battalion which inactivated on 2 December 1945 at Fort Lawton staging area, WA) was relieved from the Americal Division and assigned to the 182nd Regimental Combat Team on 8 July 1946. It reorganized and was federally recognized on 5 December 1946 with headquarters at Charlestown. Its headquarters relocated to Melrose on 30 September 1955.

The unit was relieved from the 182nd Regimental Combat Team on 1 May 1959 and reorganized as the 182nd Infantry (Mechanized) under the Combat Arms Regimental System.

In 2004 Charlie Company was attached to Task Force 1-114th and deployed to Egypt with the Multinational Forces Of Observers. Upon their return 10 volunteers from Charlie (official designated Charlie Company Forward) was attached to 3-103rd AR under 2/28 BCT. They served in Ramadi Iraq until 2006

In 2006, the regiment was reorganized and redesignated the 182nd Cavalry Regiment, ending 370 years of history as an infantry regiment. Thus as a Reconnaissance, Surveillance, and Target Acquisition force, the 1st Squadron, 182nd Cavalry Regiment served as a fast-moving armored reconnaissance unit.

From August 2006 to November 2007 the 1st Squadron 182nd Cavalry served as Task Force Patriot in Kosovo.  They were responsible for a large portion of southern Kosovo in the turbulent year that preceded final status and independence for Kosovo from Serbia.

As of 2007, the squadron had detached elements serving in Iraq and Afghanistan. In 2008, the squadron completed a 15-month tour of active duty in Kosovo supporting the NATO efforts there as part of Task Force Patriot. One notable contribution of the Task Force was the collection of school supplies and textbooks for children in remote areas of the country through its civil affairs program.

Back to infantry
An online article by the Massachusetts Army National Guard, dated 3 August 2009, stated that the unit would soon revert to an infantry configuration.

Effective 13 December 2010, the 1–182nd Cavalry was yet again redesignated to the 1–182nd Infantry Regiment.

In March 2011, the 1st Battalion 182nd Infantry mobilized for service in Afghanistan in support of Operation Enduring Freedom. In June 2011, the 182nd Infantry relieved the 181st Infantry in Afghanistan.

Delta company 2nd platoon was inserted into Assadabad Afghanistan at FOB WRIGHT in June 2011 and manned remotely positioned observation post Nevada upon a ridge line 8 kilometers from the Pakistan border over seeing the Sar Kani village and the Kunar valley. They received many distinguished decorations to include the Purple Heart, the ARCOM; they conducted more than 75 combat missions in which they were either a gunner, driver or dismounted personnel, the NATO award was awarded for service in relation to ISAF operations, the over seas service ribbon (OSR), the global war on terrorism service medal (GWOTSM), Afghanistan campaign medal with 1st campaign star, certain members of the platoon were awarded the Combat Infantry Badge for direct participation in ground combat action for having been personally present and under hostile enemy fire in Afghanistan, Pech Valley, Kunar province while leaving Cop Honaker-Miracle the patrol was ambushed with IED explosion dividing the element in half they relied on their training and prevailed with no casualties, on 17 Aug 2011 while serving with PRT Kunar in direct support of operation enduring freedom, the NAVY achievement medal was awarded to the national guard soldiers that were attached with the Navy element  
At the end of March 2012, having been relieved by the 143rd Infantry, the 182nd Infantry was released from active duty, having completed its tour in Afghanistan.

In July 2015, the 1-182 IN conducted Annual Training with the New York Army National Guard's 27th Infantry Brigade Combat Team (IBCT) as part of the 'aligned for training' initiative.  The 1-182 IN will be officially assigned to the 27th IBCT on 1 October 2016.

See also
 Massachusetts Line

Notes

Citations

Bibliography

References
182nd Infantry in World War II

Military units and formations in Massachusetts
182
182
Military units and formations established in 1636